Valdur Lahtvee (born 19 January 1958 in Antsla) is an Estonian politician. He has been member of XI Riigikogu.

He is a member of Estonian Greens.

References

Living people
1958 births
Estonian Greens politicians
Members of the Riigikogu, 2007–2011
Estonian University of Life Sciences alumni
Academic staff of the Estonian University of Life Sciences
Recipients of the Order of the White Star, 5th Class
People from Antsla